Wilms is a surname. Notable people with the surname include:

 André Wilms (1947–2022), French actor
 Friedrich Wilms (1848–1919), German botanist
 Johann Wilhelm Wilms (1772–1847), Dutch-German composer
 Max Wilms (1867–1918), German pathologist and surgeon
Wilms' tumor, a rare tumor, most common in children

Surnames from given names